Stephen Taylor Lane was the ninth Bishop of the Episcopal Diocese of Maine in The Episcopal Church. He previously served as Bishop Co-adjutor of Maine.

Lane was ordained in 1978, and served as the canon for deployment and ministry development in the Diocese of Rochester prior to his consecration.   He retired as Bishop of Maine in June 2019, and was succeeded by Thomas James Brown.

See also
 List of Episcopal bishops of the United States
 Historical list of the Episcopal bishops of the United States

References

Living people
Bishops in Maine
Year of birth missing (living people)
People from Le Roy, New York
Episcopal bishops of Maine